The Swiss Electromagnetics Research and Engineering Centre (SEREC) is the sole organization for handling electromagnetic research and concerns in Switzerland.

The Swiss Electromagnetics Research and Engineering Centre, widely known throughout the electrical engineering community by its abbreviation serec, was founded in April 2007 by the Swiss Federal Institute of Technology in Zurich (ETH Zurich).

serec is a non-profit making interdisciplinary science network that, acting as a think tank, promotes electromagnetic (EM) research and development amongst academics, government and industry. It serves as a clearing house for distributing EM information.

Firmly based in the ETH Domain membership includes some 30 individual institutes of such globally renowned technical universities as the Swiss Federal Institutes of Technology in Lausanne (EPFL) and Zurich (ETH Zurich), as well as many other engineering institutes at the leading universities of Switzerland. serec is  recognized by 6 Offices of the Federal Government of 
Switzerland.

Member organizations
Swiss Government Federal Offices:
 Swiss Federal Office for the Environment
 Federal Office for Civil Aviation of Switzerland
 Swiss Federal Office of Communications
 Swiss Federal Office of Energy
 Swiss Federal Office of Transport
 Swiss Federal Office of Metrology

University partners:
 Berne University of Applied Sciences, Department of Electrical and Communication Engineering:
 Industrial Electronics			
 Telecommunications 			
 Swiss Federal Institute of Technology Zurich (ETH Zurich), Department of Information Technology & Electrical Engineering (D-ITET):
 Biomedical Engineering (Biosenors & Bioelectronics) and (Magnetic Resonance)			
 Communication Technology (Communication Theory, Wireless Communications)
 Electrical Power Transmission (High Voltage, Power Systems)
 Electromagnetic Fields and Microwave Electronics (Computational Optics, Electromagnetics in Medicine & Biology, Terahertz Electronics)
 Electronics (Electronics, High Speed Electronics & Photonics)
 Integrated Systems (Analogue & Mixed Signal Design)
 Power Electronics Systems
 Swiss Federal Institute of Technology Zurich (ETH Zurich), Department of Mathematics:
 Seminar for Applied Mathematics
 Swiss Federal Institute of Technology Zurich (ETH Zurich), Department of Materials:
 Crystallography, Functional Materials
 Institute for Polymers
 Multifunctional Materials
 Swiss Federal Institute of Technology Zurich (ETH Zurich), Department of Mechanical & Process Engineering:
 Micro and Nanosystems
 Robotics and Intelligent Systems
 Centre of Economic Research	
 Technology and Innovation Management
 Swiss Federal Institute of Technology Zurich (ETH Zurich), Department of Physics:
 Astronomy
 Solid-State Physics
 Swiss Federal Laboratories for Materials Testing & Research (EMPA):
 Information, Reliability & Simulation Technology (Electronics/Metrology)
 Materials & Systems for the Protection & Wellbeing of the Body (Materials-Biology Interaction)
 Information, Reliability & Simulation Technology (Technology & Society)
 University of Zurich
 Functional Genomics Centre
 Swiss Research Foundation on Mobile Communication
 University of Applied Sciences of Western Switzerland, Business & Engineering School VD, Department of Information & Communication Technologies
 Lucerne University of Applied Sciences and Arts, Engineering & Architecture (Efficient Energy Systems)
 Zurich University of Applied Sciences (HSZ-T), Computational Electromagnetics and Applied R+D
 University of Applied Science Rapperswil, Department of Electrical Engineering, Communication Systems
 Swiss Federal Institute of Technology Lausanne (EPFL):
 Industrial Electronics
 Electromagnetics and Acoustics
 Electric Power Systems
 Electromagnetic Compatibility
 University of Applied Sciences of Southern Switzerland, Department of Technical Innovation (Telecommunication, Telematics & HF Systems)
 University of Adelaide, Australia, Department of RF & Electromagnetics
 University of Basle, Department of Physics & Astronomy (Nano-Electronics)
 University of Berne, Department of Applied Physics (Biomedical Photonics, Laser Physics, MM-wave & THz Optics, Microwave Physics, Quasi Optics)
 University of Duisburg-Essen, Germany, Department of Electrical & IT Engineering (General & Theoretical Electrical Engineering (ATE))
 University of Neuchâtel, Department of Microtechnology (Applied Optics, Electronics & Signal Processing)
 Zurich University of Applied Sciences/ZHAW, Department of Engineering (Competence Centre: Safety & Risk Prevention, Engineering, Digital Signalling, Sustainable Development) and Department of Research and Development

Notes and references

External links
 Official website
 Article about the foundation of serec (in German)

Organisations based in Zürich